Jesús Rubio Gómez, known as Jesús Rubio, Chus Rubio or Txus Rubio (born 9 September 1994) is an Andorran football player. He plays for Inter Club d'Escaldes and the Andorra national football team.

International
He made his debut for the Andorra national football team on 12 November 2015 in a friendly game against Saint Kitts and Nevis. On June 10, 2022, he scored his first goal with the national team against Liechtenstein, a spectacular goal with a 60-meter lob. Thanks to this goal, the second for Andorra in this match, the Pyrenean team beat Liechtenstein at home (2–1), this game was part of the 2022–23 UEFA Nations League.

International goals

Scores and results list Andorra's goal tally first.

References

External links
 
 
 Jesús Rubio at La Preferente

1994 births
Living people
Andorran footballers
FC Andorra players
UE Santa Coloma players
FC Santa Coloma players
Andorra youth international footballers
Andorra under-21 international footballers
Andorra international footballers
Association football midfielders